Peter von Beeck (died 23 February 1624 in Aachen) was a German religious figure and a canon of the church.. He is considered the author of first Latin treatise on the History of the City of Aachen.

References

1624 deaths
People from Aachen
Year of birth unknown